Milton Edgar Maybee (8 November 1872 – 3 February 1947) was a Conservative member of the House of Commons of Canada. He was born in Murray Township, Ontario and became a farmer and rancher.

Maybee attended secondary school in Trenton, Ontario then studied at Albert College in Belleville.

From 1917 to 1920, Maybee served as reeve of Murray Township. In 1919, he became Justice of the Peace for the United Counties of Northumberland and Durham and the following year became a county warden.

He was first elected to Parliament at the Northumberland, Ontario riding in the 1921 general election then re-elected in 1925 and 1926. Maybee was defeated by William Alexander Fraser (politician) of the Liberal party in the 1930 federal election.

References

External links
 

1872 births
1947 deaths
Canadian farmers
Conservative Party of Canada (1867–1942) MPs
Members of the House of Commons of Canada from Ontario
Mayors of places in Ontario